Bregman is a surname. Notable people with the surname include:

Ahron Bregman (born 1958), British-Israeli political scientist, writer and journalist, specialising on the Arab-Israeli conflict
Albert Bregman (born 1936), Canadian psychologist, professor emeritus at McGill University
Alex Bregman (born 1994), American baseball player
Buddy Bregman (1930–2017), American musical arranger, record producer and composer
James Bregman (born 1941), member of the first American team to compete in judo in the Summer Olympics
Lev M. Bregman (born 1941), Russian mathematician, most known for the Bregman divergence named after him.
Martin Bregman (1926–2018), American film producer and former personal manager
Myriam Bregman (born 1972), Argentine politician
Rutger Bregman (born 1988), Dutch historian
Solomon Bregman (1895–1953), prominent member of the Jewish Anti-Fascist Committee formed in the Soviet Union in 1942
Tracey E. Bregman (born 1963), German-American soap opera actress

See also 
Bregman divergence or Bregman distance, similar to a metric, but does not satisfy the triangle inequality nor symmetry
Bregman method, iterative algorithm to solve certain convex optimization problems
Bing Sings Whilst Bregman Swings, Bing Crosby's sixth long play album, but the first recorded with Verve